Princess Romanework Haile Selassie, sometimes spelt as Romane Work Haile Selassie (died in Turin on 14 October 1940), was the eldest child of Emperor Haile Selassie of Ethiopia by his first wife, Woizero Altayech.

Biography
The English translation of the emperor's autobiography makes no mention of Princess Romanework, or the Emperor's previous marriage, although he writes in the original Amharic version his grief at learning of the death of his eldest daughter in captivity at Turin just days after his restoration to his throne following the defeat of the Italian fascist occupation. The name of Princess Romanework's mother mentioned by Mockler- "Woizero Altayech"- may be a nickname Princess Romanework's mother used, as the contemporary source, Blata Merse Hazen Wolde Kirkos (a prominent nobleman and important figure in both the Imperial court and within the Ethiopian Orthodox Tewahedo Church), mentions Princess Romanework's mother Woizero Woinetu Amede as attending the wedding of her daughter to Dejazmatch Beyene Merid in his book about the years before the Italian occupation.

The Princess married Major-General Dejazmach Beyene Merid, governor of Bale, and they had four sons, two of whom Dejazmach Merid Beyene and Dejazmach Samson Beyene, survived to adulthood.

Princess Romanework was captured by the Italians and interned with many other noble Ethiopians on the prison island of Asinara, off the coast of Sardinia as one of the Ethiopian POWs during the Second Italo-Ethiopian War. However, her husband Beyene Merid remained at liberty and was a leader of the resistance against the Italian occupation of Ethiopia from 1936 until he too was captured, to be executed in 1937. Falling ill, Romanework was moved to the Ospedale Maggiore in Turin, where she died on 14 October 1940, probably of tuberculosis.

After the end of the Second World War, the Italians were asked to return Princess Romanework's body, and those of her two younger sons to Ethiopia, where they would be interred in the Imperial family's crypt in the Holy Trinity Cathedral at Addis Ababa. However this was never actually carried out and the Princess remains buried in the Monumental Cemetery of Turin with her son Getachew. Her surviving sons were raised by her father the Emperor Haile Selassie, and her line is currently represented by her grandson Sebastyanos Beyene, who lives in Abingdon, England.

Patronages 
 President of the Ethiopian Women's Charitable Works Association.

Honours 
 Dame Grand Cordon of the Order of the Queen of Sheba (1930).
 Imperial Coronation Medal (1930).

Ancestry

References 

1940 deaths
Romanework
Romanework
Year of birth missing
Burials at Holy Trinity Cathedral (Addis Ababa)
Haile Selassie
Daughters of emperors
Prisoners who died in Italian detention